Turkey trot are footraces, usually of the long-distance variety, held on or around Thanksgiving Day in the United States. The name is derived from the use of turkey as a common centerpiece of the Thanksgiving dinner. A few races in the United Kingdom during the Christmas period are described as turkey trots. (Turkey is traditionally eaten at Christmas.) The fun runs are often run as charity benefits and feature runners in costumes, particularly as turkeys. The Atlanta Marathon, which ran on Thanksgiving from 1981 to 2009, was the only full  marathon to run on the holiday. It has since been reduced to a half-marathon, was the nation's longest Thanksgiving Day race, while the city's full marathon is held earlier in the year, but was cancelled in 2020 because of the coronavirus pandemic, when it was replaced by a shorter race, the Peachtree Road Race. The oldest documented turkey trot, a still-ongoing annual event in Buffalo, New York, dates to 1896.

Notable races

References 

Thanksgiving
Long-distance running competitions
Road running in the United States